Holand may refer to:

Places
 Holand, Trøndelag, a village in Lierne municipality, Trøndelag, Norway
 Holand, Sortland, a village in Sortland municipality, Nordland, Norway
 Holand, Vega, a village in Vega municipality, Nordland, Norway

People
 Hjalmar Holand, an American historian and author
 Johan E. Holand, a Norwegian journalist and politician
 Lisbeth Holand, a Norwegian politician for the Socialist Left Party
 Otho Holand, an English soldier and a founder Knight of the Garter

Other
 Baron Holand, an English title

See also
 Høland, a former municipality in Akershus county, Norway
 Holland, a region and former province on the western coast of the Netherlands
 Holland (disambiguation)
 Holandia (disambiguation)